Saverio Dalla Rosa (1 June 1741 – 7 December 1821) was an Italian painter, active mainly in Verona.

Biography
He was born in Verona, and trained there under Giambettino Cignaroli, his maternal uncle. He painted sacred subjects and portraits, including one of the young Mozart. He painted frescoes for the Casa Nicolini in Verona. He sent an Annunciation to the Catholic church in St Petersburg, Russia. He became a member of the Accademia Clementina in Bologna.

In 1806, he wrote a book titled Scuola veronese di pittura, where he lists himself as professor of painting, member of the Accademia Clementina, Director of the Academy of painting, sculpture, in Verona.

References

Bibliography

1741 births
1821 deaths
18th-century Italian painters
Italian male painters
19th-century Italian painters
Painters from Verona
Italian art historians
19th-century Italian male artists
18th-century Italian male artists